Pedo may refer to
 Ped- or pedo-, a common prefix with multiple meanings
Pedo (name) 
Pedophile, someone who is sexually attracted to prepubescent children 
Pedo-repair RNA motif in RNA molecules
¡Ando Bien Pedo! (I Am Very Drunk), a 2010 studio album by Mexican group Banda Los Recoditos, which includes the song Ando Bien Pedo
Saga pedo, a species of bush cricket
Pedobacter, a genus of Gram-negative soil bacteria